Amerila lineolata is a moth of the subfamily Arctiinae. It was described by Sergius G. Kiriakoff in 1954. It is found in the Democratic Republic of the Congo.

References

  (1997). "A revision of the Afrotropical taxa of the genus Amerila Walker (Lepidoptera, Arctiidae)". Systematic Entomology. 22 (1): 1-44.
   (1954). "Hétérocères nouveaux ou peu connus du Katanga". Revue de Zoologie et de Botanique Africaines. 50: 169-188.

Moths described in 1954
Amerilini
Moths of Africa
Endemic fauna of the Democratic Republic of the Congo